Le Vernet (Languedocien: Lo Vernet) is a commune in the Ariège department in southwestern France.

Population
Inhabitants of Le Vernet are called Vernétois.

History
It was the site of Camp Vernet, a concentration camp built in 1918. During World War II it was used by the Vichy authorities to intern "undesirable aliens", primarily European refugees, including Jews, and as a transit camp for detained Jews who were to be deported to Nazi labor and extermination camps.

Transport
Le Vernet-d'Ariège station has rail connections to Toulouse, Foix and Latour-de-Carol.

See also
 Camp Vernet
 Communes of the Ariège department

References

Communes of Ariège (department)
Ariège communes articles needing translation from French Wikipedia